Angus John "Gus" Macdonald, Baron Macdonald of Tradeston,  (born 20 August 1940) is a Scottish television executive, life peer and former Labour member of the House of Lords.

Early life
Macdonald was born in Larkhall, Scotland. His father, a Highlander, had poor health and gambled. His mother, who was from a local mining family, worked multiple jobs to support and raise the family.

He won a scholarship to Allan Glen's School, Glasgow, but left at 14 to become an apprentice marine engineer at the shipyards of Alexander Stephen and Sons in Govan, Glasgow on the River Clyde and where he was one of the leaders for the apprentices' strike in 1959 along with fellow members, Billy Connolly and Alex Ferguson. Macdonald was leader of the Govan and Gorbals branch of the Labour Party's Young Socialists.

He moved to London in 1962 where he was briefly involved in revolutionary socialist politics as a member of the International Socialists, living at the London home of its foremost member, Tony Cliff. He has said that he returned to his political roots working at the Labour weekly Tribune around 1964, where he was appointed as the circulation manager by Michael Foot.

Television
He has worked as a journalist on The Scotsman and as a member of the Insight team on The Sunday Times. Originally taken on as a researcher, he was with Granada Television from 1967 to 1986 where he was soon appointed joint editor of World in Action with John Birt; Macdonald had an association with the programme for many years. He also presented Granada's What the Papers Say as well as Right to Reply and "Union World" on Channel 4.

Macdonald returned to Scotland in 1986 as Director of Programmes for Scottish Television. After four years he became Managing Director, replacing William Brown in 1990. While at STV he overhauled the station's Current Affairs output and cut the core workforce from 800 to 330  and the market value of the company grew from £50m to around £500m. The company took over two newspapers, The Herald and the Evening Times, plus the other ITV contractor in Scotland, Grampian Television. He became non-executive chairman of Scottish Media Group plc at the end of 1997, and Chairman of Taylor and Francis plc in 1998. He was appointed a Commander of the Order of the British Empire (CBE) for services to broadcasting in the 1997 Birthday Honours.

House of Lords
A year after the Labour won the United Kingdom general election Macdonald was made life peer on 2 October 1998 as Baron Macdonald of Tradeston, of Tradeston in the City of Glasgow. As a member of the House of Lords he was then appointed to be Minister for Business and Industry in the Scottish Office (1998–99), followed by Minister for Transport in the Department for Environment, Transport and the Regions, in attendance at cabinet (1999–2001) and Minister for the Cabinet Office and Chancellor of the Duchy of Lancaster (2001–03)

Member of Cabinet Office Advisory Committee on Business Appointments. Also member of House of Lords' Select Committees on Economic Affairs (2004–2008), and Communications (2009–2012).Chair of the All Party Parliamentary Humanist Group.

He retired from the House of Lords on 27 April 2017.

Other interests
In 2004, he was appointed as an adviser to fund managers Macquarie Infrastructure and Real Assets (Europe) Limited in relation to a new European Infrastructure fund which aimed to invest in road and rail projects. He is on Steering Group of the OECD Futures Programme on Infrastructure and Advisory Board of OECD International Transport Forum. In 2011, he was invited to deliver the MacMillan Memorial Lecture to the Institution of Engineers and Shipbuilders in Scotland and chose the subject "Bridging the Infrastructure Gap".

Macdonald was installed as Chancellor of Glasgow Caledonian University in October 2007, succeeding Magnus Magnusson. He also served as a member of the Council (2006–2008) and of Court (2009–) at the University of Sussex and is Patron of the Dystonia Society.

References

Publications
 "Camera: A Victorian Eyewitness", B.T. Batsford Ltd, London, 1979,

External links
 Announcement of his introduction at the House of Lords House of Lords minutes of proceedings, 8 October 1998.

|-

|-

|-

1940 births
Chancellors of the Duchy of Lancaster
Commanders of the Order of the British Empire
Labour Party (UK) life peers
Living people
Members of the Privy Council of the United Kingdom
People associated with Glasgow Caledonian University
People educated at Allan Glen's School
People from Larkhall
Scottish businesspeople
Scottish humanists
Scottish Labour politicians
Socialist Workers Party (UK) members
Scottish journalists
Scottish television presenters
Scottish television executives
Scottish trade unionists
Life peers created by Elizabeth II